Abbotsford-Clayburn was a provincial electoral district for the Legislative Assembly of British Columbia, Canada from 2001 to 2009.

Demographics

Geography

1999 Redistribution
Changes from Abbotsford to Abbotsford-Mount Lehman include:

History

Member of Legislative Assembly 
Its sole MLA was Hon. John van Dongen, a former dairy farmer who was first elected in 1995, representing the British Columbia Liberal Party.  Mr. van Dongen was appointed Minister of Agriculture, Food and Fisheries on June 5, 2001.

Election results

External links 
BC Stats - 2001 (pdf)
Results of 2001 election (pdf)
2001 Expenditures (pdf)
Website of the Legislative Assembly of British Columbia

Former provincial electoral districts of British Columbia
Politics of Abbotsford, British Columbia